The Greatest Ukrainians was a Ukrainian TV project. The programme was the result of a vote conducted to determine whom the Ukrainian public considers the greatest Ukrainians have been in history. According to Savik Shuster, more than 2.5 million people participated in voting.

The show is running under a license from the BBC and originally appeared on British TV under the name 100 Greatest Britons and was a successful show. Such countries as Canada, France, Germany, Romania and many others have also created their own versions.

Results
The TV show was broadcast on Inter being 90–180 minutes long during Sunday prime-time. The host of the program, Savik Shuster, started primaries (pre-voting) during his other Friday talk show The Freedom with Savik Shuster. The co-host of the programme was Inter's news anchor Hanna Homonai. Pre-voting took place in a number of Ukrainian cities such as Kyiv, Lviv, Yalta, Kharkiv, Odesa, Donetsk, Simferopol, Nizhyn, Mykolaiv, Ostroh, Chernivtsi, and Kamianets-Podilskyi.

Top Ten
On 11 April 2008, the top 100 of Great Ukrainians were announced. The top 10 was to be re-voted, and the results were shown on 16 May 2008. The final top 10 were:

 Yaroslav I the Wise (978–1054) (40%)
 Mykola Amosov (1913–2002) (19.88%)
 Stepan Bandera (1909–1959) (16%)
 Taras Shevchenko (1814–1861) (9.3%)
 Bohdan Khmelnytskyi (1595–1657) (4.02%)
 Valeriy Lobanovskyi (1939–2002) (3.18%)
 Viacheslav Chornovil (1937–1999) (2.63%)
 Hryhoriy Skovoroda (1722–1794) (1.73%)
 Lesia Ukrainka (1871–1913) (1.64%)
 Ivan Franko (1856–1916) (1.49%)

11100

11. Ivan Mazepa (1639–1709) Hetman of Zaporizhian Host in 1687–1708 
12. Roman Shukhevych (1907–1950) politician and military leader 
13. Vasyl Stus (1938–1985) poet and journalist 
14. Mykhailo Hrushevskyi (1866–1934) academician and historian  
15. Vitali Klitschko (1971–) politician and former professional boxer and Wladimir Klitschko (1976–) professional boxer from 1996 to til' 2017 
16. Volodymyr I of Kyiv (958–1015) prince and grand prince 
17. Serhiy Korolyov (1907–1966) rocket engineer for Soviet Union 
18. Mykola Hohol (1809–1852) dramatist 
19. Andrey Sheptytskyi (1865–1944) Metropolitan Archbishop of the Ukrainian Greek Catholic Church 
20. Viktor Yushchenko (1954–) President of Ukraine 2005–2010 
21. Yuliya Tymoshenko (1960–) politician and the first woman appointed Prime Minister 
22. Oleksandr Dovzhenko (1894–1956) film producer  
23. Volodymyr Lenin (1870–1924) communist revolutionary and political theorist 
24. Volodymyr Dal (1801–1872) lexicographer 
25. Lina Kostenko (1930–) poet and writer 
26. Symon Petliura (1879–1926) leader of the Ukrainian National Republic  
27. Leonid Bykov (1928–1979) actor and film producer 
28. Petro Konashevych-Sahaidachnyi (1582–1622) military leader  
29. Ivan Kotliarevskyi (1769–1838) writer, pioneer of modern Ukrainian literature 
30. Volodymyr Ivasiuk (1949–1979) songwriter 

31. Solomiya Krushelnytska (1872–1952) soprano 
32. Nestor Makhno (1888–1934) anarchist revolutionary 
33. Andriy Shevchenko (1976–) politician, former striker for Milan, Chelsea and football manager 
34. Danylo of Halychyna (1201–1264) king of Ruthenia 
35. Serhiy Bubka (1963–) former pole vaulter 
36. Pylyp Orlyk (1672–1742) Grand Duchy of Lithuania  
37. Ivan Kozhedub (1920–1991) military aviator 
38. Levko Lukianenko (1927–) politician 
39. Volodymyr Vernadskyi (1863–1945) founder of geochemistry, biogeochemistry, and radiogeology 
40. Yevhen Konovalets (1891–1938) military commander of the UNR army 
41. Mykola Lysenko (1842–1912) composer and pianist 
42. Sydir Kovpak (1887–1967) partisan leader in Ukraine  
43. Olha of Kyiv (890–969) saint 
44. Volodymyr Shcherbytskyi (1918–1990) politician 
45. Oleh Antonov (1906–1984) aircraft designer 
46. Yevheniy Paton (1870–1953) engineer and Borys Paton (1918–2020) chairman of National Academy of Sciences 
47. Bohdan Stupka (1941–2012) actor 
48. Yosyf Slipyi (1893–1984) Archbishop of the Ukrainian Greek Catholic Church 
49. Mykhailo Bulhakov (1891–1940) writer 
50. Volodymyr Boiko  
51. Leonid Kravchuk (1934–) First President of Ukraine 
52. Petro Mohyla (1596–1647) Metropolitan of Kyiv 

53. Ivan Sirko (1605–1680) Ukrainian Cossack military leader 
54. Sofiya Rotaru (1947–) pop singer 
55. Anatoliy Solovianenko (1932–1999) opera singer 
56. Oleh Blokhin (1952–) football manager 
57. Liliya Podkopaieva (1978–) former artistic gymnast 
58. Volodymyr II Monomakh (1053–1125) Grand Prince of Kievan Rus 
59. Mykola Hrynko (1920–1989) actor 
60. Nina Matviyenko (1947–) singer 
61. Ihor Sikorskyi (1889–1972) American aviation pioneer 
62. Viktor Yanukovych (1950–) politician and fourth President of Ukraine 
63. Leonid Brezhnev (1906–1982) General Secretary of the Central Committee  
64. Sviatoslav Vakarchuk (1975–) lead vocalist of Okean Elzy 
65. Illia Repin (1844–1930) realist painter 
66. Mariya Zankovetska (1854–1934) theater actress 
67. Ivan Mykolaichuk (1941–1987) Soviet actor 
68. Vasyl Virastiuk (1974–) Former strongman competitor 
69. Ivan Pulyui (1845–1918) physicist and inventor 
70. Mykola Pyrohov (1810–1881) medical doctor 
71. Oles Honchar (1918–1995) writer 
72. Vasyl Symonenko (1935–1963) poet and journalist 
73. Mykhailo Kotsiubynskyi (1864–1913) author 
74. Raisa Kyrychenko 
75. Nazariy Yaremchuk (1951–1995) singer 
76. Ruslana (1973–) pop singer 
77. Yana Klochkova (1982–) swimmer 

78. Les Kurbas (1887–1937) Most important theatre director of 20th century in Ukraine 
79. Petro Symonenko (1952–) politician 
80. Kostiantyn Vasyl Ostrozkyi (1526–1608) prince 
81. Roksolana (1504–1558) Wife of Sultan Süleyman the Magnificent 
82. Pavlo Skoropadskyi (1873–1945) state leader 
83. Oleksiy Stakhanov (1906–1977) miner, known for Stakhanovite movement  
84. Kateryna Vasylivna Bilokur (1900–1961) folk artist 
85. Ivan Bohun Cossack colonel 
86. Vasyl Sukhomlynskyi (1918–1970) teacher 
87. Anton Makarenko (1888–1939) social worker and educator 
88. Petro Kalnyshevskyi (1690–1803) Koshovyi Otaman of the Zaporozhian Host 
89. Mykola Vatutin (1901–1944) military commander 
90. Oleh Skrypka (1964–) musician 
91. Ivan Piddubnyi (1871–1949) professional wrestler 
92. Illia Mechnikov (1845–1916) zoologist 
93. Mykyta Khrushchov (1894–1971) statesman 
94. Olena Teliha (1906–1942) poet and activist 
95. Oleg Koshevoy (1926–1943) Soviet partisan 
96. Ostap Vyshnia (1889–1956) writer, humourist 
97. Dmytro Vyshnevetskyi (1516–1563) Hetman of the Ukrainian Cossacks 
98. Valentyn Yenevskyi 
99. Victor Glushkov (1926–1982) Founder of cybernetics 
100. Tomb of the Unknown Soldier

Great Ukrainians series
An hour-long documentary was filmed on each of the top 10 nominees, each of them hosted by a celebrity advocate, who delivered a passionate argument as to why their choice should be voted the greatest Ukrainian of all. The series concluded with a debate on the merits of each selected Ukrainian, bringing all of the advocates together to make a final plea to voters.

Controversy

Manipulations
The Chief of Great Ukrainians project, journalist Vakhtang Kipiani, informed the public in his blog, that the voting system had been manipulated by unknown persons. He stated that a couple of days prior to publishing the results he was aware of a possible win for Yaroslav the Wise. Prior to that, with a huge lead in first place was the controversial Stepan Bandera. For example, the winner, Yaroslav I, received 60,000 votes in one month and almost 550,000 in just one day. Mykola Amosov, who took second place, received almost 150,000 votes in just one day. Kipiani said that if these manipulation hadn't taken place Yaroslav would not have won.

Among other Great Ukrainians for whatever reasons appeared Vladimir Lenin as well as such names like Stakhanov, Glushkov, and Vatutin.

Other editions

Other countries have produced similar shows; see Greatest Britons spin-offs

References

External links
 Official website of the project
 Blog of the project in Live Journal
 Telekritika: Hanna Homonay will be co-hosting "Great Ukrainians"
 Kyiv Post: Ukrainians choose their ‘greats’
 Manipulations in Ukraine
 Manipulations in Ukraine II

Ukrainians
2008 Ukrainian television series debuts